Vladimir Kozubin is a Soviet sprint canoeist who competed in the mid-1970s. He won a silver medal in the K-2 1000 m event at the 1974 ICF Canoe Sprint World Championships  in Mexico City.

References

Living people
Soviet male canoeists
Year of birth missing (living people)
ICF Canoe Sprint World Championships medalists in kayak